The Battle of 42nd Street (27 May 1941) was a battle fought during World War II on the Greek island of Crete. On 20 May, Nazi Germany launched an airborne invasion of Crete. A week later, after the British and Commonwealth forces defending the island had been forced to withdraw towards Chania, a force of several understrength Australian and New Zealand infantry battalions established a defensive line along the Hania to Tsikalaria road (Tsikalarion) south-east of Chania, forming a rearguard for the withdrawing troops. On 27 May, as a German battalion advanced towards the road, the Anzac defenders carried out a bayonet charge that inflicted heavy casualties on the German attackers, which forced them to withdraw and briefly halted the German advance.

Background

Chania, a town on the north coast of Crete, was important to the military defence of Crete. Earlier British and Commonwealth forces had been defeated in Greece by the Germans and had retreated to Crete in late April 1941. While there were between 27,000 and 28,000 troops on Crete to defend it – under the command of New Zealander Major General Bernard Freyberg – most were only lightly armed because the heavier equipment had been left in Greece during the evacuation. Although the Germans were able to dominate the skies due to their superior airpower, the British Royal Navy had control of the sea. The German plan – codenamed Unternehmen Merkur (Operation Mercury) – was to use paratroopers and gliders to send forces down by air, and on 20/21 May the first landings began, concentrated around four points: Maleme, Chania, Retimo and Heraklion.

Battle
During the initial stages of the fighting on Crete, the Australians defending Heraklion managed to defeat the attack there and blunt the attack at Retimo, holding it for more than a week; however, at Maleme the Germans managed to wrest control of a vital airfield, and as a result began flying in reinforcements of airborne and mountain troops. As the Germans began moving inland to outflank the defenders' positions, the Australian, New Zealand and British forces were forced back towards Chania, which came under heavy air attack by German bombers. By 27 May, the weakened Australian 2/7th and 2/8th Battalions, supported by the New Zealand 21st, 28th, 19th, 22nd and 23rd Battalions, had taken up positions along 42nd Street, south-east of Chania where they formed a rearguard to protect the rest of the Commonwealth forces that were being pushed south. The Anzac units were manned at less than 50 percent of their normal strength, having suffered heavy casualties earlier in the fighting.

The unsealed road ran from Hania to Tsikalaria lined with olive trees running south from the main coastal road from Hania to Souda Bay. The road was lower than the surrounding land and had a raised embankment on its western side that provided cover for defending troops and formed a natural defensive line. The road was nicknamed after the 42nd Field Company of the Royal Engineers, who had previously been camped there; but was known locally as Tsikalarion Road.

The 1st Battalion of the 141st Gebirgsjager Regiment were seen approaching 42nd Street. Advancing along the Souda road, they were estimated by the Australian and New Zealand defenders as numbering about 400 men, and were attempting to raid an abandoned supply depot under the cover of mortar and machine-gun fire. In response, two companies of the Australian 2/7th Battalion – 'C' and 'D' Companies – charged the Germans, on their flank attacking with bayonets and small arms, and heavy close quarters fighting ensued. The New Zealand 28th (Maori) Battalion also joined in the charge, followed by the other battalions, and supported by machine guns of the 2/1st Machine Gun Battalion. Over 280 Germans were killed and three taken prisoner; 10 Australians from the 2/7th were killed and 28 wounded, while the Maori Battalion suffered a further 14 casualties.

Aftermath
The action halted the German 5th Alpine Division for the remainder of the day. That afternoon though, German forces were seen moving to the south-west on the flanks of the mountains trying to encircle the Anzacs. The Anzac troops withdrew joining the columns retreating south. A short time later, the British high command authorised the evacuation of Crete, ordering a withdrawal across the White Mountains to Sfakia in the south where the troops could be taken off the island by the Royal Navy. The 2/7th subsequently took part in further rearguard actions and although it was planned to evacuate it as the last Allied unit to be withdrawn, when the evacuation of Commonwealth troops ceased on 1 June due to heavy losses at sea, the majority of the battalion was captured, having helped to delay the German advance long enough to allow 12,000 troops to be withdrawn. The battalion was later rebuilt from the small cadre that managed to avoid capture, and later fought in the Pacific against the Japanese. Later, the Germans moved to bring war crime charges due to the ferocity of the fighting, claiming that the Australians and New Zealanders had killed men who were attempting to surrender, but the claim has since been refuted.

References
 Citations

 Bibliography

Further reading
 

Conflicts in 1941
1941 in Greece
Battle of Crete
Battles of World War II involving Germany
Battles of World War II involving New Zealand
Battles of World War II involving Australia
May 1941 events